Richard Ray Snuffer (born July 31, 1961, in Beckley, West Virginia) serves in the West Virginia House of Delegates since 2010.

Early life, education, and business career
Snuffer was born in 1961 in Beckley, West Virginia. He graduated the World of Faith Leadership and Bible Institute in 1985. He also attended Bluefield State University and is currently obtaining his master's degree from Marshall University.

He has been Vice President of WESCO Homes Inc. from 1971 to 2004. He also worked for Combined Insurance in 1979 and Metropolitan Life in 1982.

West Virginia legislature

2010 election
He ran for West Virginia's 27th House District. He was one of five candidates who won that seat, obtaining 13% of the vote in second place. The others were incumbent State Delegate Linda Sumner (14%), State Delegate Ricky Moye (12%), John David O'Neal (12%), and Virginia Mahan (9%).

Committee assignments
Energy, Industry and Labor/Economic Development and Small Business
Government Organization
Roads and Transportation
Senior Citizen Issues

Campaigns for higher office

2004 congressional election

In 2003, he decided to challenge incumbent Democrat U.S. Congressman Nick Rahall of West Virginia's 3rd congressional district. In the Republican primary, he defeated Marty Gearheart 58%-42%. In the general election, Rahall defeated Snuffer 65%-35%, a thirty-point margin. Rahall, first elected in 1976, fared worse in only five other elections. Snuffer won just one county, Raleigh, his home county by two points.

2006 U.S. Senate election

Snuffer then decided to challenge incumbent Democrat U.S. Senator Robert C. Byrd. He lost the Republican primary, ranking third out of six candidates with just 6% of the vote. He won just one county, Raleigh, with 48%. Businessman John Raese won with 58% of the vote.

2012 congressional election

Snuffer decided to challenge Rahall again in 2012. He won the Republican primary with 54% of the vote.

References

1961 births
Living people
Republican Party members of the West Virginia House of Delegates
Politicians from Beckley, West Virginia
Bluefield State College alumni
Marshall University alumni
Mountain State University alumni
Businesspeople from Beckley, West Virginia